Elias Angell Spikseth (born 13 July 1990) is a Norwegian racing cyclist. He competed in the men's team time trial event at the 2017 UCI Road World Championships.

References

External links

1990 births
Living people
Norwegian male cyclists
Place of birth missing (living people)